The 15th Dallas–Fort Worth Film Critics Association Awards honoring the best in film for 2009 were announced on December 16, 2009. These awards "recognizing extraordinary accomplishment in film" are presented annually by the Dallas–Fort Worth Film Critics Association (DFWFCA), based in the Dallas–Fort Worth metroplex region of Texas. The organization, founded in 1990, includes 33 film critics for print, radio, television, and internet publications based in north Texas. The Dallas–Fort Worth Film Critics Association began presenting its annual awards list in 1991.

Up in the Air was the DFWFCA's most awarded film of 2009 taking top honors in the Best Picture, Best Director (Jason Reitman), Best Actor (George Clooney), and Best Screenplay (Jason Reitman and Sheldon Turner) categories. This was the only film to win more than one category for 2009 although Precious garnered a Best Actress (Mo'Nique) honor as well as the Russell Smith Award from the critics association.

Along with the 11 "best of" category awards, the group also presented the Russell Smith Award to Precious as the "best low-budget or cutting-edge independent film" of the year. The award is named in honor of late Dallas Morning News film critic Russell Smith.

Winners
Winners are listed first and highlighted with boldface. Other films ranked by the annual poll are listed in order. While most categories saw 5 honorees named, some categories ranged from as many as 10 (Best Film) to as few as 2 (Best Cinematography, Best Animated Film, Best Screenplay).

Category awards

Individual awards

Russell Smith Award
 Precious, for "best low-budget or cutting-edge independent film

References

External links
 Dallas–Fort Worth Film Critics Association official website

2009
2009 film awards